Pali Ap'Tin Arhi (English: Again from the beginning) is an album by Antonis Remos from 1999 which sold more than 100,000 copies and became double platinum .

Track listing
Its tracks are all titled in Greek,

Again from the beginning—
Stay—Mine (Μείνε)
Prove it—
Don't apologise—
There's nothing wrong/going on—
What body is travelling you—
Double-edged kiss—
By myself—
You'll remember me—
 The light that is going down—
It's dawning—
Okay—
Only don't tell me that you love me—
Our big mistakes—
Meeting—

References

1999 albums
Antonis Remos albums